The Canadian Association of Social Workers (CASW) is the national association for the social work profession in Canada.

Introduction
CASW was founded in 1926 to establish standards of practice for social workers. It has individual members, and 10 provincial and territorial partner organizations. Its mission objective is to promote positive social services, protect the professionals of social work from mistreatment in Canada, satiate social needs of Canadians by influencing policies and advancing social justice.

It is a member of the International Federation of Social Workers (IFSW), and evaluates the credentials of foreign-trained social workers.
It makes policies and offers advice, decides ethics, and provides services to social workers. It is careful not to create any entry barriers. CASW provides benefits and advantages associated with a professional organization for its members, such as insurance packages that include professional liability insurance, group life, disability, and a retirement plan.

The CASW's Code of Ethics, last updated in 2005, together with its Guidelines for Ethical Practice, serve as the benchmark for ethical social work practice in Canada.

Non-registered and registration-inclined social workers who have completed a social work degree use LSW or LMSW, the licensed social worker designation is a common designation for career generalists and licensed master's social worker to those entering the profession with a postgraduate degree.

Provincial and Territorial Partner Organizations
CASW has nine provincial and territorial partners in Canada, representing all provinces and territories with the exception of Ontario and Québec. Affiliate memberships are offered to Social Workers in provinces not represented by a partner organization.
 British Columbia Association of Social Workers (BCASW)
 Alberta College of Social Workers (ACSW)
 Saskatchewan Association of Social Workers (SASW)
 Manitoba College of Social Workers (MCSW)
 New Brunswick Association of Social Workers (NBASW)
 Nova Scotia College of Social Workers (NSCSW)
 Prince Edward Island Association of Social Workers (PEIASW)
Newfoundland and Labrador College of Social Workers (NLCSW)
 Association of Social Workers in Northern Canada (ASWNC), representing Yukon, Northwest Territories, and Nunavut

See also 
 History of Canadian Psychiatric Social Work
 International Association of Schools of Social Work (IASSW)

Further reading
 CASW, "About CASW," http://www.casw-acts.ca/en/about-casw

References

External links 
 ADRAO - Addictions Ontario 
 CAILC - Canadian Association of Independent Living Centres
 Canadian Association of Professionals with Disabilities (National: Victoria, BC) 
 ICVA - International Council of Voluntary Agencies
 CCCF - Canadian Child Care Federation (National: Ottawa, ON)
 CCACC - Canadian Counseling Association
 CMHO - Children's Mental Health Ontario (National: Toronto, ON) 
 HCCC - Health Charities Council of Canada (National: Ottawa, ON)
 LDAC - Learning Disabilities Association of Canada (National: Ottawa, ON)
 OACYC - Ontario Association of Child and Youth Counsellors

Professional associations based in Canada
Social care in Canada
Social work organizations in Canada